Shanghai Sh. JuJu Sports Football Club are a China League Two club. They are an association football club from Shanghai. The Shanghai University Sports Center Stadium is their home venue.

History
Pu'er Wanhao F.C. was established in 2013，in the city of Pu'er, Yunnan Province. They moved to Kunming and changed its name to Yunnan Wanhao F.C. before the 2015 season. After the season, it moved to the city of Shanghai and changed their name to Shanghai JuJu Sports F.C. in January 2016.

Shanghai Sh. JuJu Sports F.C. withdrew from China League Two before the 2018 season and was dissolved.

Name history
2013–2014  Pu'er Wanhao F.C. 普洱万豪
2015  Yunnan Wanhao F.C. 云南万豪
2016–2018  Shanghai Sh. JuJu Sports F.C. 上海聚运动

Managerial history
  Zhang Biao (2014–2015)
  Radomir Koković (2016)
  Dragan Kokotović (2017)
  Hajime Ishii (2017)
  Ciprian Cezar Tudorascu (2017)

Results
All-time league rankings

As of the end of 2017 season.

 in group stage.

Key
<div>

 Pld = Played
 W = Games won
 D = Games drawn
 L = Games lost
 F = Goals for
 A = Goals against
 Pts = Points
 Pos = Final position

 DNQ = Did Not Qualify
 DNE = Did Not Enter
 NH = Not Held
 – = Does Not Exist
 R1 = Round 1
 R2 = Round 2
 R3 = Round 3
 R4 = Round 4

 F = Final
 SF = Semi-finals
 QF = Quarter-finals
 R16 = Round of 16
 Group = Group stage
 GS2 = Second Group stage
 QR1 = First Qualifying Round
 QR2 = Second Qualifying Round
 QR3 = Third Qualifying Round

References

Football clubs in Shanghai
Defunct football clubs in China
Association football clubs established in 2013
2013 establishments in China
Association football clubs disestablished in 2018
2018 disestablishments in China